Godda Assembly constituency  is an assembly constituency in  the Indian state of Jharkhand.

Overview
Godda Assembly constituency covers: Godda Police Station (excluding Burhikura, Dammajhilua, Sandmara, Nonbatta, Makhni, Pathra and Punsiya gram panchayats) and Pathargama Police Station in Godda district.

Godda Assembly constituency is part of Godda (Lok Sabha constituency).

Members of Legislative Assembly 
2005: Manohar Kumar Tekariwal, Bharatiya Janata Party
2009: Sanjay Prasad Yadav, Rashtriya Janata Dal
2014: Raghu Nandan Mandal, Bharatiya Janata Party
2016: Amit Kumar Mandal, Bharatiya Janata Party By Poll
2019: Amit Kumar Mandal, Bharatiya Janata Party

See also
Vidhan Sabha
List of states of India by type of legislature
Pathargama

References

Assembly constituencies of Jharkhand